Basketball events were contested at the 1983 Summer Universiade in Edmonton, Alberta, Canada.

External links
 Universiade basketball medalists on HickokSports
 Basketball at the 1983 Summer Universiade

Universaiie
1983 Summer Universiade
1983
Universiade